Phazaca interrupta is a species of moth of the family Uraniidae first described by William Warren in 1896. It is found in Australia, where it has been recorded from Western Australia, Queensland and New South Wales.

The wings are variable brownish grey. The hindwings have a cusp on the margin.

References

Moths described in 1896
Uraniidae